The Kresija Building is a building that together with Philip Mansion marks the entrance to the old town of Ljubljana, the capital of Slovenia. It stands at the Adamič and Lunder Embankment on the right bank of the river Ljubljanica immediately after the Triple Bridge and borders Pogačar Square, Stritar Street, and Maček Street. Until 2007, the Ljubljana Center Administrative Unit was stationed in the building. Now, it houses a number of municipal offices, the Kresija Gallery, and the Ljubljana visitor centre.

History

The name of the building comes from the German word Kreisamt, referring to the district office of Ljubljana. Before the 1895 Ljubljana earthquake, there was a building of a hospital and a school at the place. At the first floor, the district office was stationed in the first half of the 19th century. St. Elizabeth's Church stood next to it until 1831.

Architecture

The building has an irregular square plan and an inner court. It is noted for its Neo-Renaissance façades and interior. The decoration resembles of the Baroque. It was designed by the Graz architect Leopold Theyer and erected in 1897 and 1898, after the earthquake in 1895. The entrance portal of the building is turned towards the Adamič and Lunder Embankment. Above it, there is a balcony with a wrought iron fence, and above the balcony, there is a coat of arms of the city of Ljubljana in a cartouche, encased with a sculpture of a genius on each side. The genii are work by the sculptor Alojzij Repič (1866–1941).

Memorials
Since 1999, there are two busts on the southwestern facade, turned towards Stritar Street, of the Kresija Building, a bust of the Protestant grammarian Adam Bohorič and a bust of the 17th-century physician Marko Gerbec. Below the turret on the northwestern corner side, a plaque was installed in 2005 in remembrance of the Manoeuvre Structures of National Protection, a paramilitary force that secretly operated in the building in 1991 and contributed to the establishment of the independence of Slovenia. Another plaque, dedicated to the Ljubljana Coordination Group of Independence Efforts in 1991, was installed in 2008.

References

External links

Palaces in Ljubljana
Renaissance Revival architecture in Ljubljana
Cultural venues in Ljubljana
Center District, Ljubljana
Government buildings completed in 1898